Monica Bello (born 16 September 1978) is a former Australian - Italian female professional basketball player.

External links
Profile at australiabasket.com

1978 births
Living people
Basketball players from Melbourne
Australian women's basketball players
Italian women's basketball players
Point guards